Topderesi is a village in the Amasra District, Bartın Province, Turkey. Its population is 183 (2021).

Geography 
The village is 11 km from Bartın city center and 11 km from Amasra town centre.

References

Villages in Amasra District